Javier Arenas Bocanegra (born 28 December 1957 in Seville, Andalusia, Spain) is a Spanish politician. Although born in Seville, he was raised in Olvera, hometown of his parents.  He is married with two children, graduated in law and has an MA in Business Management.

Political career
He joined the Union of the Democratic Centre in the early 1980s and was President of Juventudes Centristas (Centrist Youth), the UCD youth organization. He was Deputy Mayor of Seville between 1983 and 1987 and was a member of the Parliament of Andalusia from 1986 until 1989 in which he served as Vice President of the Commission of Justice and Government. He served as a member of Congress from 1989 to 1994 and from 2000 to 2008 as deputy for Seville and represented the same province in the Spanish Senate from 1994 to 2000.  He was Vice-secretary general of the People's Party (Partido Popular, PP) between 1991 and 1993.

Between July 1993 and 1999, he was President of the PP in Andalusia (PP) and resumed the role in 2004. He was Employment Minister between 1996 and 1999, Secretary General of the People's Party between 1999 and 2003 and Minister of Public Administration between 2002 and 2003. During his spell as Second Vice-president and Minister of the Presidency between September 2003 and April 2004 one of the major pieces of legislation that he was responsible for was the Pact for Liberties and Anti-Terrorism in 2000, a bipartisan agreement between the PP and Spanish Socialist Workers' Party (PSOE), signed by both President José María Aznar and the then Leader of the Opposition Zapatero.

At the present time, he is spokesman for the Popular group in the Andalusian Parliament and Senator representing the Autonomous Community of Andalusia.  He is known to be a leading moderate member of the party and associated with the Christian-Democratic sector of the Party. He was the President of the National Electoral Committee of the PP in 2008.

See also
Bárcenas affair

References

1957 births
Deputy Prime Ministers of Spain
Government ministers of Spain
Living people
Members of the 4th Congress of Deputies (Spain)
Members of the 5th Congress of Deputies (Spain)
Members of the 7th Congress of Deputies (Spain)
Members of the 8th Congress of Deputies (Spain)
Members of the 2nd Parliament of Andalusia
Members of the 4th Parliament of Andalusia
Members of the 8th Parliament of Andalusia
Members of the 10th Parliament of Andalusia
Members of the 5th Senate of Spain
Members of the 6th Senate of Spain
Members of the 9th Senate of Spain
Members of the 10th Senate of Spain
Members of the 11th Senate of Spain
Members of the 12th Senate of Spain
Members of the 13th Senate of Spain
Members of the 14th Senate of Spain
People's Party (Spain) politicians
Seville city councillors
Union of the Democratic Centre (Spain) politicians